SMTP, Inc. is a provider of transactional email relay services.

Services 
SMTP, Inc. is a cloud service provider that specializes in sending outgoing email for large volume senders. In this regard SMTP is more akin to a technology service provider such as Amazon.com or Rackspace than email marketing company like Constant Contact. SMTP also offers related services such as tracking and reporting, reputation management, statistical analysis and expert support. 

SMTP also provides tools for checking a domain’s DKIM records in DNS as well as for checking forward-confirmed reverse DNS (FCdDNS) for an IP. 

The SMTP email delivery service requires that the emails are generated locally from a locally-kept emailing list. 

SMTP runs its own redundant data center in the Hurricane Electric and XO Communications facility in Fremont, California.

History 
The company was founded as EMUmail Inc. in 1998 by Matt Mankins. Three years later Mankins sold EMUmail to the software development company AccuRev. About a year later, former AccuRev CEO and EMUmail board member Semyon Dukach bought EMUmail. 

In 1997, SMTP board member Rens Troost co-authored RFC 1806 which provides a mechanism whereby messages conforming to the (RFC 1521) ("MIME") specification can convey presentational information. 

In 2005, Lux Scientiae bought the EMUmail outsourcing services business, leaving the SMTP.com email delivery service as the company’s core offering.

The company changed its name to SMTP, Inc. in November 2010. SMTP filed an initial public offering (IPO) and began trading on the OTC Bulletin Board as (OTCBB: SMTP) on May 2, 2011, and then on the Nasdaq Capital Market on January 31, 2014. 

SMTP has acquired PreviewMyEmail.com service for online email content preview from a Turkish company Octeth in exchange for $160,000 cash on January 10, 2013.

 
Jonathan M. Strimling has been appointed CEO by SMTP's Board of Directors on August 15, 2013. 

SMTP acquired SharpSpring, Inc., a marketing automation company, in 2014 and the company became SharpSpring, Inc. (SHSP). In 2016, SharpSpring sold SMTP to the Electric Mail Company.

References 

Companies established in 1998
Companies based in Cambridge, Massachusetts